Robert Edward Heintz (born May 1, 1970) is an American professional golfer who plays on the Nationwide Tour.

Heintz was born in Syosset, New York. He was a three-time Ivy League champion at Yale University.

Heintz turned professional in 1992 and joined the Nike Tour (now Nationwide Tour) in 1994, then took a hiatus and did not return to the Tour until 1999 where he won two events, the Nike Shreveport Open and the Nike Tour Championship, en route to finishing 6th on the money list and earning his PGA Tour card for 2000. After a poor rookie year on Tour, he returned to the Nationwide Tour in 2001 but got back to the PGA Tour in 2002 through qualifying school. He did not earn his PGA Tour card for 2003 and returned to the Nationwide Tour that year where he played for two years before getting back his PGA Tour card in qualifying school for 2005. Again he was not able to retain his card and returned to the Nationwide Tour in 2006. He went through qualifying school for the third time and returned to the PGA Tour in 2007 where he had his best year on tour, recording two fifth-place finishes and finishing 136th on the money list, earning him partial status on tour for 2008. He split time between the PGA and Nationwide Tour in 2008 and earned his PGA Tour card for 2009 through qualifying school for the fourth time. He returned to the Nationwide Tour in 2010 and has been playing on it since.

Playing as a PGA Tour non-member out of the 151–200 money list category, Heintz had a very close call at the 2010 Reno-Tahoe Open where he missed a 3.5 foot (1.1 m) putt on the final hole to get into a playoff with Matt Bettencourt for an opportunity for his first PGA Tour victory.

Beginning in 2012, Heintz served as the University of Pennsylvania's men's head golf coach. He guided the Quakers to an Ivy League title in 2015. He joined the Duke University men's golf program on February 10, 2017.

Professional wins (2)

Nike Tour wins (2)

Nike Tour playoff record (1–0)

See also
1999 Nike Tour graduates
2001 PGA Tour Qualifying School graduates
2004 PGA Tour Qualifying School graduates
2006 PGA Tour Qualifying School graduates
2008 PGA Tour Qualifying School graduates

External links

American male golfers
PGA Tour golfers
College golf coaches in the United States
Korn Ferry Tour graduates
Golfers from New York (state)
Golfers from Florida
Yale University alumni
People from Syosset, New York
Sportspeople from Clearwater, Florida
1970 births
Living people